Havelock, New Brunswick is a Canadian rural community in Kings County, New Brunswick.  Havelock is at the junction of Route 885 and Route 880. There is a small public airport nearby.

The community is situated on a large lime deposit and its extraction has driven the local economy, beginning with a Lafarge cement plant constructed in the 1960s and current mothballed since the early 1990s.  Graymont operates a lime quarry and kiln to supply eastern Canada and New England with 300 tonnes per day.

History

Havelock was named after Sir Henry Havelock and was previously known as Butternut Ridge.

Notable people

 Lily May Perry, botanist
 George McCready Price, creationist

See also
 List of communities in New Brunswick

Communities in Kings County, New Brunswick
Lime kilns in Canada
Quarries in Canada
Mining communities in New Brunswick